Isobelle Jane Carmody (born 16 June 1958) is an Australian writer of science fiction, fantasy, children's literature, and young adult literature. She is recipient of the Aurealis Award for best children's fiction.

Biography
Isobelle Carmody was born in Wangaratta on 16 June 1958, the eldest of eight children.  She began work on Obernewtyn Chronicles at the age of fourteen. This was soon after the death of her father in a traffic accident.  She continued to work on them while completing a Bachelor of Arts, majoring in literature and philosophy; she worked in public relations and journalism.

The Stone Key, book five of the Obernewtyn Chronicles, was released in February 2008. The Sending, book six of that series, was officially released on 31 October 2011. The seventh and final book, The Red Queen, was released in November 2015.

She was Guest of Honour at the 2007 Australian National Science Fiction Convention, Convergence 2, held in Melbourne in June 2007.

Personal
Her partner is Jan Stolba, a Czech musician and poet. She currently divides her time between her home on the Great Ocean Road in Victoria, and her travels abroad with her partner and daughter, spending a year each in her two residences.

Books

Picture books
Journey From the Centre of the Earth (2003), illustrated by Marc McBride
Wildheart (2002), illustrated by Steven Woolman
Dreamwalker (2000), a story in graphic novel form, illustrated by Steven Woolman
The Wrong Thing (2006), illustrated by Declan Lee (rewritten for the US/Canada and published as Magic Night)
Night School (2010), illustrated by Anne Spudvilas
Evermore (2015), illustrated by Daniel Reed

Awards
2011 - Children's Book Council of Australia Awards
 Younger Readers Book of the Year: winner for The Red Wind2008 – Aurealis Awards Young Adult Novel: Shortlisted for The Stone Key2007 – Aurealis Awards Children's Novel: shortlisted for A Fox Called Sorrow2006 – ABPA Book Design Awards Fiction: winner for Little Fur: the Legend of Little Fur2006 – Aurealis Awards Golden Aurealis novel: winner for Alyzon Whitestarr
 Young Adult Novel: winner for Alyzon Whitestarr
 Children's Long Fiction:  winner for Little Fur: The Legend Of Little Fur2002 – Aurealis Awards Young Adult Short Story Award: winner for Dreamwalker1998 – Aurealis Awards Young Adult Novel: winner for Greylands
 Fantasy Novel:  shortlisted for "Darkfall: Book One of the Legendsong"1998 – Ditmar Awards
 Australian Long Fiction: shortlisted for Darkfall

1997 – Aurealis Awards
 Young Adult Short Story: winner for Green Monkey Dreams

1997 – Fantasy, Sci-Fi, Horror, Stories
 Young Adult Division: winner for Greylands

1996 – Aurealis Awards
 Young Adult Novel: shortlisted for Ashling

1994 – The Children's Book Council of Australia Awards
 Book of the Year for Older Readers: joint winner for The Gathering

1994 – W.A. Young Readers Book Award (WAYRA)
 Second for The Gathering

1993 – Children's Peace Literature Award (PEACE)
 Best Book: joint winner for The Gathering

1992 – 3M Talking Book Award – (NSW)
 Talking Book:  Winner for Scatterlings

1991 – The Children's Book Council of Australia Awards
 Book of the Year for Older Readers – Honour Book for The Farseekers: the Obernewtyn Chronicles

1988 – The Children's Book Council of Australia Awards
 Book of the Year for Older Readers: shortlisted for Obernewtyn: The Obernewtyn Chronicles

A more complete list of Isobelle Carmody's nominations and awards can be found on the author profila at Penguin Books

References

External links
Isobelle Carmody: The Official Website
Obernewtyn.net: The Official Obernewtyn Chronicles Fansite
The Slipstream: Isobelle Carmody's blog

1958 births
Living people
Australian children's writers
Australian women novelists
Australian fantasy writers
People from Wangaratta
Women science fiction and fantasy writers
Writers of young adult science fiction
20th-century Australian women writers
21st-century Australian women writers
20th-century Australian novelists
21st-century Australian novelists
Australian women children's writers